List of Newfoundland cases of the Judicial Committee of the Privy Council cases (pre-1949)

This page lists cases appealed from the Newfoundland courts to the Judicial Committee of the Privy Council, prior to 1949.

Before 1949, Newfoundland was a separate British possession, with Dominion status from 1907 to 1949.  An appeal lay from the Newfoundland courts to the Judicial Committee of the Privy Council, the highest court in the British Empire and Commonwealth.  In 1949, Newfoundland joined Canada as a province.  In the same year, Canada ended all appeals from Canadian courts to the Judicial Committee, but court cases begun prior to the abolition date could still be appealed to the Judicial Committee.  Cases begun after the abolition date could be appealed to the Supreme Court of Canada.

References 

Dominion of Newfoundland law
Newfoundland
Newfoundland
Judicial Committee of the Privy Council cases
Canada and the Commonwealth of Nations